Kendall Grove is a historic plantation house located near Eastville, Northampton County, Virginia. It was built about 1813, and is a two-story, Federal style wood-frame house with two-story projecting pavilions on the front and the rear and smaller two-story wings on each end added about 1840.  It is cross-shaped in plan.  The main house is joined by a long passage to a wood-frame kitchen-laundry.  The house was improved about 1840, with the addition of Greek Revival style interior details.  It was the home of Congressman and General Severn E. Parker. The home has the name of Colonel William Kendall, the original owner of the site.

It was listed on the National Register of Historic Places in 1982.

References

External links
Kendall Grove, State Route 674, Eastville, Northampton County, VA 12 photos, 2 data pages, and 2 photo caption pages at Historic American Buildings Survey
Kendall Grove, Connecting Passageway & Kitchen, State Route 674, Eastville, Northampton County, VA 8 photos and 1 photo caption page at Historic American Buildings Survey
Kendall Grove, Dairy, Outhouse, & Smokehouse, State Route 674, Eastville, Northampton County, VA 1 photo and 1 photo caption page at Historic American Buildings Survey

Historic American Buildings Survey in Virginia
Plantation houses in Virginia
Houses on the National Register of Historic Places in Virginia
Federal architecture in Virginia
Greek Revival houses in Virginia
Houses completed in 1813
Houses in Northampton County, Virginia
National Register of Historic Places in Northampton County, Virginia
1813 establishments in Virginia